The Pro Wrestling League (PWL) is an Indian sport wrestling promotion that was first established in 2015. It was initiated by ProSportify and Wrestling Federation of India.

Structure 
The Pro Wrestling League includes six franchises, which represent cities throughout India. The teams are formed via auction.

The league adheres to United World Wrestling rules for all weight categories. All the seasons so far of PWL hosted six teams, each consisting of 9 players. During the group stage all the team meet each other once. While the top after group stages qualifies to the playoffs.
During group stages out of 9 weight categories 7 category bouts are held, the teams gets to block any one category bouts they want, they have to play all bouts even if they win the match before the last bout. During the playoffs all the 9 category bouts are held and a team wins a match when it wins 5 bouts.

Bidding 
In every season of PWL, all players participate in a bidding system. Players are listed in an auction where each team owner bags a chosen player after making the highest bid.

Teams

Winners

See also 
 Sports in India

References 

Sport in India
2015 establishments in India
Recurring sporting events established in 2015
Wrestling competitions in India